"My Baby" is a 1965 hit single recorded by The Temptations for the Gordy (Motown) label. Written by Miracles members Smokey Robinson, Bobby Rogers, and Pete Moore and produced by Robinson, the song was a top 20 pop hit in the United States, and a top 5 hit on the R&B charts.

An extension of the theme from the group's #1 hit "My Girl", which had been released the previous December, "My Baby" features The Temptations, with David Ruffin on lead, bragging about the qualities of a special lady. Ruffin praises his woman's hairstyles ("hair soft like a baby lamb/and I love to run my fingers through it") and personality ("the gold in her personality/could set Fort Knox to shame"), and hopes that "she digs me the way I am/but if I have to change/you know I'm gona do it for my baby".

Cash Box described the single as an "easy-going, pop-r&b romantic shuffler about a love-sick fella who’ll do anything for his girlfriend."  "My Baby" was a notable attempt to create an uptempo danceable number for the Temptations; all of their previous Top 20 hits to this point had been either ballads or mid-tempo numbers. The single immediately following "My Baby", "Get Ready", followed the same plan, and was produced with an even faster tempo and a brassier arrangement.

Unusually for Temptations singles, "My Baby's" B-side, the Paul Williams-led "Don’t Look Back", was a minor hit in its own right, becoming a top 20 R&B hit and serving for several years as the Temptations' live-show closing number. Both sides of the single would be remixed for its 2nd pressing, adding on the following statements: "Taken from the album #G 914 The Temptin' Temptations."

Personnel
 Lead Vocals by David Ruffin
 Background Vocals by Eddie Kendricks, Melvin Franklin, Paul Williams, and Otis Williams
 Written by  William "Smokey" Robinson, Robert Rogers, and Warren Moore
Produced by Smokey Robinson
 Instrumentation by The Funk Brothers

Chart history

References

 Williams, Otis and Romanowski, Patricia (1988, updated 2002). Temptations. Lanham, MD: Cooper Square. .
 Williams, Otis and Weigner, Harry (2002). My Girl: The Very Best of the Temptations (Compact disc liner notes). New York: Motown/Universal Records.

External links
 See "The Temptations perform My Baby'' at this link

1965 singles
The Temptations songs
Songs written by Warren "Pete" Moore
Songs written by Smokey Robinson
Songs written by Bobby Rogers
Song recordings produced by Smokey Robinson
Gordy Records singles
1965 songs